The Chord Line connects  and  via Vriddhachalam in Tamil Nadu. It is the shortest route connecting  and Trichy. This rail route is 65 km shorter than the main line.

History 
Hence, the need for shorter route arose and construction began on 22 August 1927 for a new railway line via  in phases. This line gradually reduced the Madras - Colombo journey by around four hours.

Gauge conversions 
The conversion from metre gauge to broad gauge was effected during 1992-93 and completed during September 1998.

Electrification 
This stretch was proposed for electrification phase by phase by CORE. The electrification was completed during 2010.

Famous Trains
1. Chennai Egmore-Madurai Tejas Express - Celebrity of Chord line.

2. Vaigai Superfast Express - King of Chord line.

3. Pallavan Superfast Express - Prince of Chord line.

Operations

Passenger services 
The line experiences a heaviest traffic handling about 30 passenger and 56 express trains passing through every day in addition to goods train, particularly during night.

Despite the fact that multiple south Tamil Nadu bound trains pass via chord line, there are no 'A' grade stations in the chord line between Trichy and Villupuram.

Freight services 
The line has a number of Industrial establishments which utilises their nearby railway stations for their logistics and transports such as Central Workshop (Golden Rock), Cement and gypsum factories at Trichy, Perambalur and Ariyalur, and the Sugar factories at Villupuram and Vriddhachalam,

References

External links
 Southern Railways - Official Website

5 ft 6 in gauge railways in India
Railway lines opened in 1929
Transport in Tiruchirappalli